Chandwad Assembly constituency is one of the 288 Vidhan Sabha (legislative assembly) constituencies of Maharashtra state in western India.

Overview
Chandwad is part of the Dindori Lok Sabha constituency along with five other Vidhan Sabha segments, namely Dindori, Kalvan Assembly constituency, Nandgaon, Niphad Assembly constituency and Yeola Assembly constituency.

Members of Legislative Assembly
 1985: Jaychand Deepchand Kasliwal, Bharatiya Janata Party
 1990: Jaychand Deepchand Kasliwal, Bharatiya Janata Party
 1995: Jaychand Deepchand Kasliwal, Bharatiya Janata Party
 1999: Shirishkumar Kotwal, Nationalist Congress Party
 2004: Uttam Ganpat Bhalerao, Nationalist Congress Party 
 2009: Shirishkumar Kotwal, Independent
 2014: Dr.Rahul Daulatrao Aher, Bharatiya Janata Party
 2019: Dr.Rahul Daulatrao Aher, Bharatiya Janata Party

Election results

Assembly Elections 2004

Assembly Elections 2009

Assembly Elections 2014

See also
 Chandwad
 Deola
 List of constituencies of Maharashtra Vidhan Sabha

References

Assembly constituencies of Nashik district
Assembly constituencies of Maharashtra